Schenker AG is an Austrian logistics company and a subsidiary of Deutsche Bahn, the German railway company. Within DB Logistics, the logistics branch of Deutsche Bahn, Schenker is responsible for land, sea, and air transport and contract logistics. Rail transport within DB Logistics is done under the DB Schenker Rail brand.

Performance

Schenker has roughly 72,000 employees at some 2,000 offices around the world and has a turnover of 14.943 billion € per year.

DB Logistics claims to be:
 No. 1 in European land transport
 No. 3 in worldwide air transport
 No. 3 in worldwide sea transport
 No. 5 in worldwide contract logistics

History

Gottfried Schenker founded Schenker & Co. in Vienna, Austria, in 1872.

In 1931, Schenker was acquired by the German Railways (Reichsbahn). After Hitler came to power in 1933, the Nazis placed  Dr. Edmund Veesenmayer, on the board. During the Nazi era, the Schenker Company was "one of the most important enterprises engaged in pillage and plunder during German aggressions and mass crimes throughout Europe in the period from 1938 to 1945."

The Schenker papers, which recorded shipping via Schenker of Nazi looted art, were discovered by British Monuments Man Douglas Cooper and enabled researchers to track down some of the artworks stolen from Jews during the Holocaust.

In 2003, Schenker became a wholly owned subsidiary of Deutsche Bahn, when DB acquired Stinnes AG.

On 31 January 2006, DB Logistics acquired BAX Global for $1.1 billion and is currently being merged country by country with Schenker.

In 2010, DB Schenker opened a major new intermodal transport hub in Salzburg.

DB Schenker launched Schenker Ventures, its own venture capital arm to invest in innovation in the logistics industry, in 2021. The next year, Schenker Ventures announced its first investment in German logistics startup Warehousing1.

Special Tasks 
 Schenker was the official carrier of the 1972 Summer Olympics in Munich, 2000 in Sydney and 2002 in Salt Lake City.
 Schenker supports the United Buddy Bears exhibitions worldwide. A particular challenge was the realization of the exhibition in Pyongyang (North Korea), 2009.
 At the EfeuCampus in Bruchsal Schenker is testing with partners such as Volocopter, KIT or SEW Eurodrive on emission free and autonomous for urban freight logistics. The Living lab is funded by the European Union and the state Baden-Württemberg.

See also
 DB Schenker
 Deutsche Bahn
 Gottfried Schenker

References

External links
 
 About Schenker from its website
 "Bax Goes Schenker" campaign on merging Bax Global with Schenker
 

Logistics companies of Germany

pl:Schenker